Charles Henry Payne (1830–1899), a clergyman, revised the hymn-book of the Methodist denomination in the late 19th century. He was president of Ohio Wesleyan University and an author.

Biography
Charles Payne was born in Taunton, Massachusetts on October 24, 1830. He received an A.B. from Wesleyan University in Middletown, Connecticut in 1856, and an A.M. from the same university in 1859. Payne studied at the Biblical Institute in Concord, New Hampshire and joined the Providence Conference of the Methodist Episcopal Church in 1857. Subsequently, he erected St. John's church in Brooklyn, N.Y. at a cost of $200,000 and the Arch Street church in Philadelphia, Pennsylvania at a cost of $260,000. He was president of Ohio Wesleyan University in Delaware, Ohio from 1876 to 1888.

Payne was an organizer, member, and principal contributor of the committee to revise the hymn-book of his denomination in 1876, a delegate to the General Methodist Conferences of 1880, 1884, 1888, 1892 and 1896, and a delegate to the Ecumenical conference in London in 1881. He traveled extensively in Egypt, Europe, Greece, the Holy Land, and Syria.

He received the honorary degrees D.D. from Dickinson College in 1870 and LL.D. from Ohio State University in 1875. Payne is the author of, among other works:

The Social Glass, and Christian Obligation (1868)
Daniel, the Uncompromising Young Man (1872)
Young People's Half-Hour Series (1872)
Methodism, its History and Results (1881)
Women, and their Work in Methodism (1881)
Temperance (1881)
Education (1881)
Guides in Character Building (1883)

He died at Clifton Springs, New York on May 5, 1899.

References

American religious writers
People from Taunton, Massachusetts
Wesleyan University alumni
Methodist writers
19th-century American people
1830 births
1899 deaths